Franklin's gull (Leucophaeus pipixcan) is a small (length 12.6–14.2 in, 32–36 cm) gull. The genus name Leucophaeus is from Ancient Greek leukos, "white", and phaios, "dusky". The specific pipixcan is a Nahuatl name for a type of gull.

Description
It breeds in central provinces of Canada and adjacent states of the northern United States. It is a migratory bird, wintering in Argentina, the Caribbean, Chile, and Peru.

The summer adult's body is white and its back and wings are much darker grey than all other gulls of similar size except the larger laughing gull. The wings have black tips with an adjacent white band. The bill and legs are red. The black hood of the breeding adult is mostly lost in winter.

Young birds are similar to the adult but have less developed hoods and lack the white wing band. They take three years to reach maturity.

Measurements:

 Length: 12.6-14.2 in (32-36 cm)
 Weight: 8.1-10.6 oz (230-300 g)
 Wingspan: 33.5-37.4 in (85-95 cm)

Although the bird is uncommon on the coasts of North America, it occurs as a rare vagrant to northwest Europe, south and west Africa, Australia and Japan, with a single record from Eilat, Israel, in 2011 (Smith 2011), and a single record from Larnaca, Cyprus, July 2006. At the beginning of 2017 has been observed also in Southern Romania, southeast Europe.

Behaviour
They are omnivores like most gulls, and they will scavenge as well as seeking suitable small prey. In the spring, on rivers such as the Bow River large groups will float with the current, sipping the emerging insect hatch. The behaviour includes floating through a particular stretch and returning repeatedly to the same section.

Reproduction

The birds breed in colonies near prairie lakes with the nest constructed on the ground, or sometimes floating. The two or three eggs are incubated for about three weeks.

Naming
The bird was named after the Arctic explorer Sir John Franklin, who led an 1823 expedition in which the first specimen of Franklin's gull was taken.

References

External links

 
 Franklin's Gull Species Account – Cornell Lab of Ornithology
 Franklin's Gull - Larus pipixcan – USGS Patuxent Bird Identification InfoCenter
 Stamps (for Marshall Islands) with Americas' RangeMap
 
 Franklin's Gull article photo 1 of 3 write-up and photos

Franklin's gull
Native birds of the Canadian Prairies
Native birds of the Plains-Midwest (United States)
Franklin's gull
Franklin's gull
Articles containing video clips
Taxobox binomials not recognized by IUCN